The 2022 Open delle Puglie was a professional tennis tournament played on outdoor clay courts. It was the first edition of the tournament and part of the 2022 WTA 125 tournaments, offering a total of $115,000 in prize money. It took place at the Circolo del Tennis at the Via Martinez in Bari, Italy between 5 and 11 September 2022.

Singles entrants

Seeds

 1 Rankings are as of 29 August 2022.

Other entrants 
The following players received a wildcard into the singles main draw:
  Vittoria Paganetti
  Matilde Paoletti
  Lisa Pigato
  Lucrezia Stefanini

The following players received entry into the main draw through qualification:
  Nuria Brancaccio
  Paula Ormaechea
  Andreea Roșca
  Eva Vedder

The following players entered the main draw as lucky losers:
  Andrea Gámiz
  Ioana Loredana Roșca

Withdrawals 
Before the tournament
  Elina Avanesyan → replaced by  Kateryna Baindl
  Ana Bogdan → replaced by  Rebeka Masarova
  Lucia Bronzetti → replaced by  Carolina Alves
  Clara Burel → replaced by  Ioana Loredana Roșca
  Jule Niemeier → replaced by  Andrea Gámiz
  Jasmine Paolini → replaced by  Jaimee Fourlis
  Nuria Párrizas Díaz → replaced by  Réka Luca Jani
  Mayar Sherif → replaced by  Dalila Jakupović
  Viktoriya Tomova → replaced by  Ylena In-Albon
  Zheng Qinwen → replaced by  Raluca Șerban

Doubles entrants

Seeds 

 1 rankings as of 29 August 2022.

Other entrants
The following pair received a wildcard into the doubles main draw:
  Vittoria Paganetti /  Lucrezia Stefanini

Champions

Singles

  Julia Grabher def.  Nuria Brancaccio 6–4, 6–2

Doubles

  Elisabetta Cocciaretto /  Olga Danilović def.  Andrea Gámiz /  Eva Vedder 6–2, 6–3

References

2022 WTA 125 tournaments
Tennis tournaments in Italy
2022 in Italian tennis
September 2022 sports events in Italy